Wyatt M. Webb (April 6, 1941 – October 8, 2003) was a college basketball head coach for the Akron Zips men's basketball team from 1969 to 1975. When Webb was named head coach in 1968, it was unheard of for someone in his mid-20s (Webb was 26) to be in such a position.

Career 
Webb had finished his playing career at Akron just a few years earlier. He Webb proved the doubters wrong, compiling a 126–60 record in seven seasons and taking the Zips to three NCAA Division II tournaments, including a title game appearance in 1971–72. Even though he resigned after 1975, he stayed at the university as a teacher and chairperson.

Webb died in 2003 at the age of 62.

References

1941 births
2003 deaths
Akron Zips men's basketball coaches
Akron Zips men's basketball players
Basketball coaches from Ohio
Basketball players from Ohio
Ohio State University alumni
University of Cincinnati alumni